West Township, Illinois may refer to one of the following townships:

 West Township, Effingham County, Illinois
 West Township, McLean County, Illinois

See also

West Township (disambiguation)

Illinois township disambiguation pages